Arthur Peter König (September 13, 1856, Krefeld – October 26, 1901, Berlin) devoted his short life to physiological optics. Born with congenital kyphosis he studied in Bonn and Heidelberg, moving to Berlin in the fall of 1879 where he studied under Hermann von Helmholtz, whose assistant he became in 1882. After obtaining a doctoral degree in 1882 he qualified for a professorial position in 1884. In 1890 he became director of the physical department of the Physiological Institute of the University of Berlin. In the same year he married Laura Köttgen with whom he had a son, Arthur, who became an astronomer. Circulatory problems caused by his kyphosis resulted in his premature death in 1901.

Originally working in physics, he began in 1883 to concentrate on physiological optics where he published over thirty papers, some of seminal importance. Among these are the 1886 paper (together with Conrad Dietrici) Fundamental sensations and their sensitivity in the spectrum, an empirical determination of what in fact is the spectral sensitivity of the human rod and cone sensors of vision.

Earlier attempts at such measurements, but based on much simpler technology, had been made in 1860 by the English physicist James Clerk Maxwell (1831–1879). Using newly development spectrophotometric equipment and modifications of the experimental procedure König and Dieterici published a more detailed paper in 1892, determining the "fundamental sensations" not only of subjects with normal color vision (trichromats) but also of dichromats and monochromats.

With these measurements König provided evidence for the conjecture that the most common form of color blindness, dichromacy, is due to the absence of one cone type in the eye. Averaged König functions were widely used in psychophysical color stimulus calculations until new data based on a slightly different method and involving many more observers were determined by J. Guild and W. D. Wright in the later 1920s, resulting in the recommendations of standard observer data by the Commission Internationale de l'Eclairage (CIE, International Commission on Illumination) in 1931.

Other important investigations involve the sensitivity of the normal eye for differences in wavelength of light, dependence of the Newton/Grassmann laws of color mixture on light intensity, validity of Fechner's law at different light intensities, brightness of spectral hues at different light intensities,
 and the similarity between the perceptual sensitivity of the rod cells and the absorption spectrum of the rod photopigment, rhodopsin.

König was very active as an editor. In 1889 he became the sole editor of Verhandlungen der Deutschen Physikalischen Gesellschaft. From 1891 on, together with the psychologist H. Ebbinghaus, he edited the journal Zeitschrift für Psychologie und Physiologie der Sinnesorgane. After Helmholtz's death in 1894 König took on the task of completing preparations for the second edition of the former's Handbuch der physiologischen Optik (1896, Treatise on physiological optics) to which he added a bibliography of vision consisting of nearly 8,000 titles.

König's 32 papers on physiological optics were published posthumously in book form in 1903.

References 

1856 births
1901 deaths
19th-century German physicists
People from Krefeld
People from the Rhine Province